Sergei Illarionovich Vasilchikov (9 September 1849 – 27 August 1926) was an Imperial Russian division commander. He was born in Kiev in modern-day Ukraine. He was the son of Imperial Russian general Illarion Illarionovich Vasilchikov. He fought in the war against the Ottoman Empire. He was promoted to major general in 1891 and lieutenant general in 1899. He was the father of Hilarion Vassilchikov. After the October Revolution, he went into exile.

Awards
Order of Saint Anna, 3rd class, 1874
Order of Saint Stanislaus (House of Romanov), 2nd class, 1877
Order of Saint Anna, 2nd class, 1878
Order of Saint Vladimir, 4th class
Order of Saint Vladimir, 3rd class, 1888
Order of Saint Stanislaus (House of Romanov), 1st class, 1894
Order of Saint Anna, 1st class, 1896
Order of Saint Vladimir, 2nd class, 1904
Order of the White Eagle (Russian Empire), 1906
Order of Saint Alexander Nevsky, 1913

Sources
 Большая Российская энциклопедия:В 30т./Председатель науч.-ред. совета Ю. С. Осипов. Отв. ред. С. Л. Кравец. Т4. Большой Кавказ—Великий канал. — М.:Большая Российская энциклопедия,2006. 751с.:ил.:карт. — С.649. ( (Т.4)
 Волков С. В. Офицеры российской гвардии:опыт мартиролога. — М.:Русский путь,2002. — 568 с. — С.91
 Биография на сайте «Русская императорская армия»
 

Russian military personnel of the Russo-Turkish War (1877–1878)
Recipients of the Order of St. Anna, 3rd class
Recipients of the Order of Saint Stanislaus (Russian), 2nd class
Recipients of the Order of St. Anna, 2nd class
Recipients of the Order of St. Vladimir, 4th class
Recipients of the Order of St. Vladimir, 3rd class
Recipients of the Order of Saint Stanislaus (Russian), 1st class
Recipients of the Order of St. Anna, 1st class
Recipients of the Order of St. Vladimir, 2nd class
Recipients of the Order of the White Eagle (Russia)
1849 births
1926 deaths